This List of hospitals in Oregon (U.S. state) is not complete.

Operating

Defunct

See also 
 List of hospitals in Portland, Oregon
 Lists of Oregon-related topics

References 
 Oregon Hospitals Directory from U.S. News & World Report

External links 

 Map of Oregon trauma centers

Oregon
 
Hospitals in Oregon